Cooke Optics Ltd. is a camera lens manufacturing company based in Leicester.

Administratively speaking, Cooke Optics is a spin-off of the company Taylor-Hobson. However, Taylor-Hobson used to be a lens manufacturer and Cooke lenses used to be its sole activity before Taylor-Hobson moved to the market of metrology instruments. Hence the foundation of Cooke Optics can be regarded as the foundation of Taylor, Taylor and Hobson (TTH) in 1886, and Cooke Optics can be regarded as the successor of the original Taylor, Taylor and Hobson business.

The name Cooke originally came from the company T. Cooke & Sons of York, a manufacturer of telescopes. The optical manager of that company, H. Dennis Taylor (no relation), devised the Cooke triplet lens in the 1890s. Cooke of York was not interested in the manufacture of camera lenses, and licensed this design and others to TTH. Subsequently many of TTH's own designs, though unconnected with Cooke of York, also carried the Cooke brand. The Cooke triplet lens was also made under licence by Voigtländer and other companies.

Throughout the twentieth century TTH produced a series of innovations, and supplied lenses for the (once large) UK camera industry, for photolithography in the printing industry in the USA and UK, and for cinematography. It provided a succession of technical solutions for Hollywood's evolving needs.

Notable products include:
 a soft-focus 'portrait' lens favoured by Clarence White and Alfred Stieglitz
 the Aviar aerial survey lens, designed in World War I when German lenses and optical glass became unavailable to the RAF
 the Series XV triple-convertible lens for 10×8 inch cameras, favoured by Ansel Adams and others (also see below)
 the Opic and Speed Panchro large-aperture lenses, widely used by Hollywood
 the inverse telephoto (retrofocus) lens, created for use with the early Technicolor process, and now the standard design for wide-angle lenses in 35 mm and other small-format cameras
 high-quality zoom lenses for cinematography and television
 high quality lenses for cinema projectors

Bell & Howell took control of the company in 1930, but it was sold to Rank in 1946. In its later years, Taylor-Hobson's main interest was metrology, and it now operates as a subsidiary of Ametek.

In 1998, Cooke Optics was a new company formed following a buy-out of the Optical division of Taylor-Hobson. Chairman Les Zellan led the buy-out. Dave Stevens was then Managing Director of the Leicester-based facility and remained so until 2008 when Robert Howard replaced him as Chief Executive Officer.

The company now designs and manufactures 35 mm lenses for the film industry. In a reversion to its previous markets, it has also made limited quantities of the PS945, a redesigned Pinkham and Smith portrait lens, and the Series XVa, a redesigned triple-convertible lens for 10×8 inch format. The company distributes to over 60 countries worldwide and exports 90% of its production.

In 2013, the Academy of Motion Picture Arts and Sciences gave the company an award of merit, saying it "helped define the look of motion pictures over the last century," with innovations over the years that have included zoom lenses for movie cameras and lenses that did not require bright lights. resulting in lenses that produce what is known in the industry as the "Cooke look" — warm, natural images on the screen.

References

Further reading
 Wilkinson, Matthew, and Colin Glanfield. A lens collector's vade mecum. (CD publication) "Version 7/5/2001" (7 May 2001).

External links
Official site
History
Cooke Soft Focus Lenses
1890s: Cooke triplet
1910s: Shackleton and World War I
1920s: Hollywood and Everest conquered
1930s: Technicolor and Beyond
1940s: Bell & Howell
1950s: Pros and amateurs
1960s: The cinema advances
1970s: 20–100mm
1980s: Zoom, zoom, zoom
1990s: Cooke S4 primes
2000s: and Beyond

Lens manufacturers
Manufacturing companies of the United Kingdom
Photography companies of the United Kingdom
Photography in the United Kingdom
British brands
Recipients of the Scientific and Technical Academy Award of Merit